If I Could is an album by saxophonist Stanley Turrentine recorded in 1993 and released by the MusicMasters label.

Reception

AllMusic reviewer Scott Yanow stated "This session from tenor-saxophonist Stanley Turrentine often sounds like a CTI recording from the 1970s ... Turrentine's solos are stronger than the melodies and he generally overcomes the unimaginative use of strings on the ballads. Mr. T. is in fine form and he makes the most of each selection ... Recommended".

Track listing
 "June Bug" (Tommy Turrentine) – 7:46
 "Caravan" (Juan Tizol, Duke Ellington, Irving Mills) – 15:20
 "I Remember Bill" (Don Sebesky) – 6:09	
 "The Avenue" (Charles Fambrough) – 3:52
 "Marvin's Song" (Tommy Turrentine) – 6:03
 "Maybe September" (Ray Evans, Percy Faith, Jay Livingston) – 3:30
 "A Luta Continua" (Vincent Evans) – 6:20
 "If I Could" (Pat Metheny) – 4:45

Personnel 
Stanley Turrentine – tenor saxophone
Hubert Laws – flute, piccolo
Sir Roland Hanna – piano
Ron Carter – bass 
Grady Tate – drums
Gloria Agostini – harp
Steve Kroon – percussion
Matthew Raimondi - concertmaster
Don Sebesky – arranger
Vincent Leroy Evans - kalimba (track 7)

References 

1993 albums
Stanley Turrentine albums
MusicMasters Records albums
Albums arranged by Don Sebesky